Gandiali Bala is a town in Kohat District in Khyber Pakhtunkhwa province of Pakistan. It is located to the north of Kohat city, the Gandiali dam is located in this town.

References 

Populated places in Kohat District